Céline Lebrun (born 25 August 1976 in Paris) is a French judoka born in Paris, France. She has competed in judo at both national and international level.  She won gold medals in 4 European championships (1999, 2000, 2002, and 2005), and a world championship in 2001.

Lebrun has competed in the Sydney 2000 and Athens 2004 Olympic Judo events in the half-heavyweight category, earning a silver medal in 2000 and a 5th placing in 2004.

References

External links

 
 
 
 Videos on Judovision.org

1976 births
Living people
Sportspeople from Paris
French female judoka
Olympic judoka of France
Olympic silver medalists for France
Judoka at the 2000 Summer Olympics
Judoka at the 2004 Summer Olympics
French people of Martiniquais descent
Olympic medalists in judo
Medalists at the 2000 Summer Olympics
Mediterranean Games gold medalists for France
Mediterranean Games medalists in judo
Competitors at the 1997 Mediterranean Games
20th-century French women
21st-century French women